Social Analysis: The International Journal of Anthropology is a peer-reviewed academic journal published by Berghahn Books covering the humanities and other social sciences. It presents contributions directed toward a critical and theoretical understanding of cultural, political, and social processes. Social Analysis is published four times a year and is edited by Judith Bovensiepen, Martin Holbraad and Hans Steinmüller.

Indexing and abstracting 
Social Analysis is indexed and abstracted in:
 Abstracts in Anthropology
 Anthropological Index
 Anthropological Literature
 British Humanities Index
 International Bibliography of Book Reviews of Scholarly Literature on the Humanities and Social Sciences
 International Bibliography of Periodical Literature
 International Political Science Abstracts
 Left Index
 Linguistics and Language Behavior Abstracts
 MLA International Bibliography
 Scopus
 Social Services Abstracts
 Sociological Abstracts
 Worldwide Political Science Abstracts

External links 
 

Berghahn Books academic journals
Triannual journals
English-language journals
Sociology journals
Publications established in 1993